The Wisconsin Pavilion is located in Neillsville, Wisconsin.

History
The pavilion was built on the order of Clark Prudhon of Evansville, Wisconsin. It would house Wisconsin-themed displays at the 1964 New York World's Fair. Upon the conclusion of the fair, the pavilion was disassembled and stored in Boscobel, Wisconsin. Eventually, it was purchased by Central Wisconsin Broadcasting Inc. and shipped to Neillsville, where it was re-built.

The radio stations WCCN-FM and WCCN (AM) broadcast out of the pavilion. It is also used as a gift shop and specialty store. Located next to it is 'Chatty Belle', declared to be the world's largest talking cow, it was also featured in the World's Fair.

In 2010, it was added to the State Register of Historic Places. Eventually, it was also added to the National Register of Historic Places in 2012.

References

Commercial buildings on the National Register of Historic Places in Wisconsin
National Register of Historic Places in Clark County, Wisconsin
1964 New York World's Fair
Mass media in Wisconsin
Modernist architecture in Wisconsin
Buildings and structures completed in 1964